Azarshahr railway station ( – Īstgāh Rāh Ahan-e Āẕarshahr) is a railway station and village in Dastjerd Rural District, Gugan District, Azarshahr County, East Azerbaijan Province, Iran. At the 2006 census, its population was 16, in 4 families.

References 

Populated places in Azarshahr County
Railway stations in Iran